Philipp Oswald (born 23 January 1986) is an Austrian professional tennis player who primarily plays doubles events on the ATP Tour. On 7 December 2009, he reached his highest ATP singles ranking of world No. 206, and his highest doubles ranking of No. 31 was reached on 21 June 2021. In 2021, he participated in the 2020 Tokyo Olympics partnering with Oliver Marach.

ATP career finals

Doubles: 21 (11 titles, 10 runners-up)

Challenger and Futures finals

Singles: 18 (10–8)

Doubles: 81 (54–28)

Doubles performance timeline

Current through the 2022 Open Sud de France.

References

External links
 
 
 

1986 births
Living people
Austrian male tennis players
People from Feldkirch, Vorarlberg
Sportspeople from Vorarlberg
Olympic tennis players of Austria
Tennis players at the 2020 Summer Olympics
21st-century Austrian people